Gustavo García (born 26 October 1956) is a Colombian sports shooter. He competed in the mixed trap event at the 1984 Summer Olympics.

References

1956 births
Living people
Colombian male sport shooters
Olympic shooters of Colombia
Shooters at the 1984 Summer Olympics
Place of birth missing (living people)
20th-century Colombian people